Sophia Elizabeth Herzog (born March 20, 1997) is an American swimmer. She won a medal at the 2016 Paralympic Games.  She competes in the Paralympic class SB6. She was named to the US National team in 2019.

Career
On April 14, 2022, Herzog was named to the roster to represent the United States at the 2022 World Para Swimming Championships.

References

Living people
1997 births
Sportspeople from Denver
Swimmers at the 2016 Summer Paralympics
Swimmers at the 2020 Summer Paralympics
Medalists at the 2016 Summer Paralympics
Medalists at the 2020 Summer Paralympics
Paralympic swimmers of the United States
Paralympic medalists in swimming
Paralympic silver medalists for the United States
Paralympic bronze medalists for the United States
Medalists at the World Para Swimming Championships
Medalists at the 2015 Parapan American Games
DeVry University alumni
American female breaststroke swimmers
American female freestyle swimmers
American female medley swimmers
S6-classified Paralympic swimmers
21st-century American women